Thorp Branch is a stream in Holt County in the U.S. state of Missouri.

Thorp Branch (also historically called "Thorp's Creek") has the name of William Thorp, the proprietor of a local watermill.

See also
List of rivers of Missouri

References

Rivers of Holt County, Missouri
Rivers of Missouri